Sheshegwaning First Nation is an Odawa First Nation on Manitoulin Island in Ontario, Canada. Its land base is located on the Sheshegwaning 20 reserve.

References

Odawa reserves in Ontario
Ojibwe governments
Communities in Manitoulin Island